WQUA (102.1 MHz) is an FM radio station broadcasting a Religious format. Licensed to Citronelle, Alabama, the station broadcasts to the Mobile metropolitan area.  The station is owned by Family Worship Center Church, Inc., part of evangelist Jimmy Swaggart's ministries.

References

External links

Former subsidiaries of The Walt Disney Company
QUA